Top-seeded pair Sherwood Stewart and Ferdi Taygan won the title after beating Robbie Venter and Blaine Willenborg in the final.

Seeds
A champion seed is indicated in bold text while text in italics indicates the round in which that seed was eliminated.

Draw

Finals

Top half

Bottom half

References

External links

U.S. Clay Court Championships
1982 U.S. Clay Court Championships